Datong Hui and Tu Autonomous County () is an autonomous county of Hui and Tu peoples in Qinghai Province, China. It is under the administration of the prefecture-level city of Xining, the capital of Qinghai.

Since 2009, a folk music "Flower Festival" has been held annually in late July on "Mount Laoye" (2928 m) in Datong town.

Climate

Transportation 
 China National Highway 227
 Xining–Datong Expressway (Ningda Expressway)
 Xining–Datong Railway (Ningda Railway), a 39-km long dead-end railway branch constructed in 1966-1968  and primarily serving a local coal mine. In the past, passenger service operated on the line, but ceased in 2008.
Lanzhou–Xinjiang High-Speed Railway (Datong West Station), opened in December 2014. Very limited service.

See also
 List of administrative divisions of Qinghai

References

County-level divisions of Qinghai
Hui autonomous counties
Monguor autonomous counties
Xining